The Seventh Dwarf, is a German 3D computer-animated film, created in 2014. The film is based upon the fairy tale Sleeping Beauty and characters from Snow White and the Seven Dwarfs. It is a sequel to the films 7 Dwarves – Men Alone in the Wood (2004) and 7 Dwarves: The Forest Is Not Enough (2006), and is the first animated film in the series. The film was released in cinemas on 25 September 2014 in Germany and on 31 July 2015 in the United States. The director Harald Siepermann died in February 2013 during the production of the film.

Plot 
In the castle Fantabularasa there is a big celebration for the 18th birthday of Princess Rose, who has been cursed by the evil ice fairy, Dellamorta. If she is pricked with a sharp object before midnight, the whole kingdom will sleep for one hundred years. Thus, the princess is required to wear armor. Everything goes according to plan until clumsy Bobo, the seventh dwarf, makes a big mistake and Dellamorta's curse is fulfilled. Only with a kiss of true love the curse can be stopped, but Dellamorta captures the kitchen boy, Jack, who loves Rose. With the help of a dragon named Burner, the dwarves search for "Prince Charming".

Cast 
Almost all performers of the first two films gave their characters their voices.

Reception 
On review aggregator website Rotten Tomatoes, the film holds an approval rating of 22% based on 9 reviews. On Metacritic, which assigns a normalized rating to reviews, the film has a weighted average score of 20 out of 100, based on 6 critics, indicating "generally unfavorable reviews".

Soundtrack 

Track list (Soundtrack)
 ‘Hauptthema I’
 ‘Bakery Song’ (Kuchenback Lied)
 ‘Kuchenschlacht’
 ‘Hey, Dwarves ...’ (Hey Zwerge)
 ‘Ankunft im Schloss’
 ‘Happy Birthday’
 ‘Dellamorta's Tango’
 ‘Waffen!’
 ‘Merman Rap’ (Meermänner Rap)
 ‘Freundschaft’
 ‘Take a Chance’ (Gib dir ne Chance)
 ‘Pfeifen & Barbershop’
 ‘Fairy Tales’ (Manchmal werden Märchen wahr)
 ‘Size Doesn't Matter’
 ‘Burner entdeckt Bubi’
 ‘Schlittenfahrt’
 ‘Der Hoftüftler’
 ‘Das Drachentor’
 ‘Geh nicht weiter’
 ‘Schlosswalzer’
 ‘Der Fluch’
 ‘Eisriese’
 ‘Hauptthema II’

References

External links 
 
 

Universal Pictures animated films
2014 films
2014 computer-animated films
German animated films
German comedy films
German children's films
2010s German-language films
Films based on Snow White
Seven Dwarfs
2010s German films